The Mirographe, sold by Reulos, Goudeau and Co. around 1900, was, with the Chrono Pocket Gaumont, one of the French amateur film cameras to use the reduced format.

Film stock
Its films measured 6 meters by 21mm wide and had 80 frames per metre. They did not include perforations, but rather a notch on the side between each frame. The driving of the film was done by a system of "snail" wheel, having a rim about 5mm that was advanced the notch of the film. The diameter of this wheel is constant for 3/4 of the rotation (the image is fixed) and then declined steadily while leading the film, allowing for the film to rest between frames.

Models
There are two models of Mirographe. The first is used for shooting, the direct view and projection of films. A second, type B, was only used for projection.

The Mirographe was also marketed by Mazo and Georges Mendel in 1901.

References

Cameras introduced in 1900